The Tahiti national rugby union team is a third tier rugby union team, representing the island of Tahiti in French Polynesia, an overseas collectivity of France. They first played in 1971 and have played numerous games to date, most against rivals Cook Islands and several against Niue. Other games have been played against Samoa, Wallis and Futuna, Papua New Guinea and Tonga. France played a match against Tahiti at the end of their 1979 tour and won 92–12. Plans to have annual "test" match series against Pacific island neighbours, New Caledonia have been put on hold, due to time, availability, finances, and coaching and refereeing resources. They have yet to qualify for the Rugby World Cup. Rugby union in Tahiti is administered by the Fédération Tahitienne de Rugby de Polynésie Française. Currently, players who have represented or played for the Tahiti national rugby team, are eligible to represent France. However, playing at a professional level can only enable this. At present there are several Tahitian professional rugby players abroad in France's Top 14 and Pro D2 professional competition.

History

Rugby is greatly growing in popularity in Tahiti, but the national sport still remains soccer.

Rugby came to Tahiti via three separate streams, firstly, through the visits of British, New Zealand and Australian sailors; secondly, through the French presence (many of the main teams are still French military); and thirdly through contact with neighbouring Pacific islands, where the game is popular.

Tahiti first played the game in 1971. 

It was founded in 1989 and became affiliated to the International Rugby Board in 1994.

It is also a full member of Oceania Rugby, which is the governing body for rugby union in Oceania.

Up to 2003, Tahiti played in international rugby sevens (Pacific Games) and XV-a-side, in the qualifying rounds for the Rugby World Cup.

In 2006, there were fourteen clubs in the national championship and two divisions. There were also sevens competitions, women's rugby, and under-18 rugby competitions as well.

In 2017 Tahiti won the Oceania Rugby Cup, beating their rivals Cook Islands at BCI Stadium in Rarotonga, Cook Islands by a score of 13–9.

Uniform and colors
Tahiti’s kit are typically All red with white tribal, designs, etc. They also can be seen using a white jersey with red tribal, designs, etc. In the past they have used all white kits with red as their secondary color, and also Red jersey with the Tahitian flag colors and black shorts.

Kit providers

Home grounds
Tahiti have played most of their home matches at Stade Pater Te Hono Nui and Stade Fautaua.

Tahiti has also hosted matches for numerous Pacific Games and Oceania Cup. They share these venues with the Tahiti national football team and club sides from both rugby and football.

Annually Tahiti hosts the Papeete International Sevens Tournament.

Record

Oceania Cup
Tahiti competes in the Oceania Cup which is played against seven other Pacific nations: American Samoa, Cook Islands, New Caledonia, Niue, Papua New Guinea, Solomon Islands and Vanuatu. Tahiti has competed in the very first Oceania Cup when it was created in 1997. Since 2015, Tahiti has played 4 matches against: Papua New Guinea, Solomon Islands, American Samoa and Cook Islands recording a record of 3 wins and 1 loss. Their only loss was to 2015 Oceania Cup Champions Papua New Guinea, and until this date, it has been their only loss since then. They placed second in the standings table and were Runner-up in the tournament. In 2017 they won the Oceania Cup beating their rival Cook Islands in the 2017 Oceania Cup Championship by a score of 9–13 in Avarua, Cook Islands.

Oceania tournaments

Oceania Cup

Notes:
 Part of the Rugby World Cup qualification process.
 The final of the 2007 tournament was not held until April 2008. Starting from 2009, the tournament has been held biennially.

Rugby World Cup

Overall
 are currently ranked 84th on the World Rugby Rankings table.

Players
Tahiti Nui XV “Aito”

Head coach:  Romi Ropati

Notable players
Vakatini Atuahiva (JJ) Played for Counties Manukau Steeelers NZ 1982, 1991–1995: Manawatu 1984–1990 NZ:, NZ All Black Colts 1982 & 1984:
NZ Divisional XV 1993: NZ Maori All Black 1994: Cook Island 7s and XV

Guest players
These players were capped for Tahiti in an invitational match against  to celebrate Bastille Day in Papeete on 14 July 1981:
Enrique Rodríguez (dual international for  & )
Brett Codlin (All Blacks, 1980)
Robert Kururangi (All Blacks, 1978 & Māori All Blacks, 1982)
Tim Twigden (All Blacks, 1979–80)

See also
Rugby union in Tahiti

References

Oceanian national rugby union teams
Rugby union in Tahiti
Rugby union in French Polynesia
R
1971 establishments in French Polynesia
Rugby clubs established in 1971